

History

The foundation

The construction
The Milan Innovation District (MIND) site is about 15 kilometres (9.3 mi) northwest of Milan, in the municipalities of Rho and Pero, and covers an area of 1.1 km2 (0.42 sq mi).
The site includes the reuse of the same exhibition areas used for Expo 2015.

The master plan
 Human Technopole - The Italian Research Institute in Milan (Palazzo Italia)
 Hospital Galeazzi
 The campus of the University of Milan
 Fondazione Triulza

Companies
 AstraZeneca

See also
 University of Milan
 Genoa Erzelli GREAT Campus
 Istituto Italiano di Tecnologia

References

External links
 - official website

Science and technology in Italy